"Certain People I Know" is a song by English singer-songwriter Morrissey, released in December 1992 as the third single from his third studio album, Your Arsenal (1992). It was the third and final Morrissey single to be produced by glam rock musician Mick Ronson. Reaching number 35 in the UK Singles Chart, the song had the distinction of being Morrissey's lowest-charting solo single up to that point.

"Certain People I Know" was the first Morrissey single to be released following the singer's bottling off stage at the Madstock festival when he supported Madness and the subsequent NME story regarding his alleged racism. This led to the single cover being changed from featuring the singer's name spelt out in the colours of the Union Jack to plain black writing.

Reviews
Ned Raggett of AllMusic called the lead track "a bit of an odd choice" for a single but added that its B-sides "are among Morrissey's best".

Track listings
7-inch vinyl and cassette
 "Certain People I Know" (Morrissey, Alain Whyte)
 "Jack the Ripper" (Morrissey, Boz Boorer)

12-inch vinyl and CD
 "Certain People I Know" 
 "You've Had Her" (Morrissey, Boorer)
 "Jack the Ripper"

Musicians
 Morrissey: voice
 Alain Whyte: guitar
 Boz Boorer: guitar
 Gary Day: bass guitar
 Spencer Cobrin: drums

References

Morrissey songs
1992 singles
1992 songs
Rockabilly songs
Songs written by Alain Whyte
Songs written by Morrissey